VR may refer to:

Arts, entertainment and education
 Virtual reality, a computer technology that simulates an environment with which a user may interact as if it was actually there
 Virtua Racing, a 1992 arcade racing game by Sega
 Vocational rehabilitation
 Spectre VR, an enhanced version of Spectre
 VR.5,  an American science fiction television series in 1995
 VR Troopers, an American action television show from 1994 to 1996

Businesses
 VR (company), a Finnish railway company, formerly known as Valtion rautatiet (State Railways)
 Valdosta Railway, in the US state of Georgia
 Victorian Railways, in the Australian state of Victoria
 Viktor & Rolf, an Amsterdam-based fashion house
 German Cooperative Financial Group (Volksbanken und Raiffeisenbanken)
 Cape Verde Airlines (IATA airline code)

Government and military
 Vetenskapsrådet, the Swedish Research Council
 Volunteer Reserves (United Kingdom)
 Fleet Logistics Support, a squadron of the US Navy

Science and technology
 VR (nerve agent), a nerve gas, also known as Russian VX, Soviet V-gas, Substance 33, or R-33
 Venous return, the rate of bloodflow returning to the heart
 Vibration Reduction, an anti-shake lens technology by Nikon
 Virtual reality therapy, for the treatment of PTSD patients

Computing and electronics
 VR photography, the creation and viewing of wide-angle panoramic photographs, generally encompassing a full circle
 QuickTime VR, an image file format developed by Apple for panoramic images
 Videocassette recorder, a device that records and plays back analog audio and video using magnetic tape
 Voltage regulator, an electric circuit designed to maintain a constant voltage level
 DVD-VR, an editable optical media format

Transportation
 VR, an aircraft's rotation speed
 VR6 engine, a family of internal combustion engines made by Volkswagen
 Holden Commodore (VR), an automobile introduced by Holden in 1993
 Bristol VR, a double-decker bus built by the Bristol Commercial Vehicles
 VR Group, a Finnish railway company

Other uses
 Vanguardia Revolucionaria, a Peruvian political group
 Voluntary redundancy, a financial incentive offered by an organisation to encourage employees to voluntarily resign
 University of Iceland VR, three buildings on the University of Iceland campus
 VR, for Victoria Regina, in the royal cypher of Queen Victoria

See also